Chernobyl: The Final Warning is a 1991 American made-for-television disaster drama film starring Jon Voight, Jason Robards, and Sammi Davis. The film chronicles the Chernobyl disaster.

Plot
Based on a true account of events, the plot interweaves the stories of a fireman at the nuclear power plant, his pregnant wife, the government officials whose policies helped and hindered rescue efforts and America's Dr. Robert Gale (Jon Voight), who led the international medical team that helped treat survivors of the disaster. Robert Gale published the original account of his experiences as Final Warning: The Legacy of Chernobyl in 1988 with Thomas Hauser; it was adapted by Ernest Kinoy for the screenplay.

Cast

Jon Voight as Dr. Robert Gale
Jason Robards as Dr. Armand Hammer
Sammi Davis as Yelena Mashenko
Annette Crosbie as Dr. Galina Petrovna
Ian McDiarmid as Dr. Vatisenko
Vincent Riotta as Valery Mashenko
Steven Hartley as Aleksandr Mashenko
Jim Ishida as Dr. Terasaki
Alex Norton as Dr. Andreyev
Trevor Cooper as Feodor Lashelya
Sebastian Shaw as Grandpa
Jack Klaff as Dr. Pieter Claasen
Chris Walker as Grisha
Lorcan Cranitch as Chernov
Yuri Petrov as Viktor Vasilichyov
Karen Meagher as Anna
Caroline Milmoe as Sonya
Debora Weston as Tamar Gale
Jonathan Hachett as George Castle
Keith Edwards as Champlin
Vladimir Troshin as Mikhail Gorbachev
Vadim Ledogorov as Leonid Scherchenko
Nicholas Locker as Dr. Gale's Son
Shir Gale as Dr. Gale's Daughter

References

External links
 

1991 television films
1991 films
1990s disaster films
1990 drama films
1990 films
American disaster films
Disaster films based on actual events
Disaster television films
American docudrama films
Films directed by Anthony Page
Films scored by Billy Goldenberg
TNT Network original films
Films about the Chernobyl disaster
American drama television films
1990s English-language films
1990s American films